Fábio Laguna (Brazil, March 1977) is a keyboardist most famous for playing with Angra since 2001 and for being a member of Hangar band since 2002. In 2006 he released his last solo album called Freakeys along with members of both bands.

Biography
Born in Mococa, a small city from São Paulo state in Brazil, Fábio began playing simple keyboards from an early age. Along with his older brother André, both had keyboard classes, which Fabio dropped early. As a teenager, he began rehearsing within his first rock band and having his first small concerts. After that he played in a small professional night band and for 4 years he toured the states of São Paulo and Minas Gerais in a VW Transporter (commonly known in Brazil as "Kombi", short form of "Kombinationfahrzeug").

After a tough decision of studying law, along with the college he played in other small rock bands, arranged and produced his first records and worked as a freelancer in several other bands too only for money.
In 1999 Fábio started playing with heavy metal bands, and he recorded his first solo album, All Night Party at Gallamauaka's Land, which he used as a curriculum vitae for his 8 years of music by the time he was finishing college. Record company Mega Hard contacted Hangar and Fábio recorded the Inside Your Soul album.

By 2001, the famous Brazilian band Angra had been split and reformed with Hangar's drummer Aquiles Priester. Aquiles asked Fábio to join them for the Rebirth tour. Of course he accepted, dropping all other professional commitments in order to become "a heavy-metal keyboardist in the land of samba". He played a 100 concerts in 17 countries in this tour. In 2001 he also released All Night Party at Gallamauaka's Land.

2003 had Fábio touring Brazil with Hangar, which he had become a full member the year before. He also recorded keyboards for the debut album of Thalion, Another Sun.
His second solo album was called Freakeys, having Angra's and Hangar's members playing progressive metal, and was released in 2006.

In 2016, he was announced as the new keyboardist for folk metal band Tierramystica.

Discography
 Flávio Marx Band - Em um Estado Imaginário
 Spirit Heaven - Aria's Kingdom
 Funeratus - Upcoming Apparition
 Funeratus - Storm of Vengeance
 Eyes of Shiva - Eyes of Shiva
 Thalion - Another Sun
 William Shakespears's Hamlet (various)
 Angra - Rebirth World Tour - Live in São Paulo
 Angra - Hunters and Prey
 Hangar - Inside Your Soul
 Fábio Laguna - All Night Party at Gallamauaka's Land
 Freakeys - Freakeys
 Hangar - The Reason of Your Conviction
 Edu Falaschi - Vera Cruz (2021)

References

External links
  Interview

Brazilian heavy metal keyboardists
Angra (band) members
Living people
1977 births
Musicians from São Paulo (state)